Hannu Oksanen (born 15 November 1957) is a Finnish ice hockey player. He competed in the men's tournament at the 1984 Winter Olympics.

Career statistics

Regular season and playoffs

International

References

External links
 

1957 births
Living people
Finnish ice hockey players
Olympic ice hockey players of Finland
Ice hockey players at the 1984 Winter Olympics
People from Ylöjärvi
Sportspeople from Pirkanmaa